Indigofera kirilowii is a species of flowering plant in the family Fabaceae, native to eastern, central and northern China, the Korean Peninsula, and Kyushu island of Japan. The unimproved species and a whiteflowered "alba" selection are commercially available.

References

kirilowii
Garden plants of Asia
Flora of Southeast China
Flora of North-Central China
Flora of Inner Mongolia
Flora of Manchuria
Flora of Korea
Flora of Japan
Plants described in 1899